The 2005 NESTEA European Championship Tour (or the 2005 European Beach Volleyball Tour) was the European beach volleyball tour for 2005.

The tour consisted of four tournaments with both genders, including the 2005 Championship Final.

Tournaments
Nestea Turkish Open, in Alanya, Turkey – 12–15 May 2005
Nestea Spanish Open, in Valencia, Spain – 7–10 July 2005
Nestea Swiss Open, in Lucerne, Switzerland – 7–9 August 2005
2005 Nestea European Championship Final (Nestea Russian Open), in Moscow, Russia – 25–28 August 2005

Tournament results

Women

Men

Medal table

References

 

European
Nestea European Championship Tour